The 2014 Under-21 Provincial Championship was a rugby union competition held between the Under-21 players from the fourteen provincial rugby unions in South Africa, plus the  sub-union. It was contested from 11 July to 25 October 2014.

Group A

Competition

There were seven participating teams in the 2014 Under-21 Provincial Championship Group A. These teams played each other twice over the course of the season, once at home and once away.

Teams received four points for a win and two points for a draw. Bonus points were awarded to teams that scored 4 or more tries in a game, as well as to teams that lost a match by 7 points or less. Teams were ranked by points, then points difference (points scored less points conceded).

The top 4 teams qualified for the title play-offs. In the semi-finals, the team that finished first had home advantage against the team that finished fourth, while the team that finished second had home advantage against the team that finished third. The winners of these semi-finals played each other in the final, at the same venue as the 2014 Currie Cup Premier Division Final.

The bottom team in Group A played a play-off game at home against the winner of the Group B final for a place in the 2015 Under-21 Provincial Championship Group A.

Teams

Team listing

The following teams took part in the 2014 Under-21 Provincial Championship Group A competition:

Log

Fixtures and results
 Fixtures are subject to change.
 All times are South African (GMT+2).

Round one

Round two

Round three

Round four

Round five

Round six

Round seven

Round eight

Round nine

Round ten

Round eleven

Round twelve

Round thirteen

Round fourteen

Semi-finals

Final

Honours

Group B

Competition

There were eight participating teams in the 2014 Under-21 Provincial Championship Group B. These teams played each other once over the course of the season, either at home or away.

Teams received four points for a win and two points for a draw. Bonus points were awarded to teams that scored 4 or more tries in a game, as well as to teams that lost a match by 7 points or less. Teams were ranked by points, then points difference (points scored less points conceded).

The top 4 teams qualified for the title play-offs. In the semi-finals, the team that finished first had home advantage against the team that finished fourth, while the team that finished second had home advantage against the team that finished third. The winners of these semi-finals played each other in the final, at the same venue as the 2014 Currie Cup First Division Final.

The winner of the final played a play-off game away from home against the bottom team in Group A for a place in the 2015 Under-21 Provincial Championship Group A.

Teams

Team listing

The following teams took part in the 2014 Under-21 Provincial Championship Group B competition:

Log

Fixtures and results
 Fixtures are subject to change.
 All times are South African (GMT+2).

Round one

Round two

Round three

Round four

Round five

Round six

Round seven

Round eight

Semi-finals

Final

Honours

Promotion/relegation play-off

  were promoted to 2015 Under-21 Provincial Championship Group A.
  were relegated to 2015 Under-21 Provincial Championship Group B.

See also
 2014 Currie Cup Premier Division
 2014 Currie Cup qualification
 2014 Currie Cup First Division
 2014 Vodacom Cup
 2014 Under-19 Provincial Championship

External links

References

Under-21 Provincial Championship
Currie Cup Under-21